The Zimbabwe national cricket team toured Pakistan from October to November 1996 and played a two-match Test series against the Pakistan national cricket team. Pakistan won the Test series 1–0. Zimbabwe were captained by Alistair Campbell and Pakistan by Wasim Akram. In addition, the teams played a three-match One Day International (ODI) series which Pakistan won 3–0.

Tour match

Three-day match: Pakistan Cricket Board XI vs Zimbabweans

Test series

1st Test

2nd Test

ODI series

1st ODI

2nd ODI

3rd ODI

Notes

References

External links
 Series home at ESPN Cricinfo

1996 in Pakistani cricket
1996 in Zimbabwean cricket
International cricket competitions from 1994–95 to 1997
Pakistani cricket seasons from 1970–71 to 1999–2000
1996